The Roman Catholic Diocese of Daru-Kiunga is  a suffragan diocese of the Roman Catholic Archdiocese of Port Moresby. It was erected Prefecture Apostolic in 1959 and elevated to a diocese in 1966. The authors of the diocesan coat of arms are Slovak heraldic artists Marek Sobola and Drahomír Velička.

Bishops

Ordinaries
Gérard-Joseph Deschamps, S.M.M. (1961–1999), appointed Bishop of Bereina
Gilles Côté, S.M.M. (1999–2021) Retired
Joseph Tarife Durero, S.V.D. (2021–present)

Auxiliary bishop
Gilles Côté, S.M.M. (1995–1999), appointed Bishop here

References

External links and references

Daru-Kiunga